Peter McCauley (born 8 March 1950) is an actor from New Zealand who has appeared in many television series and movies, mainly in his home country.

Career 
McCauley graduated from Toi Whakaari: New Zealand Drama School in 1973 with a Certificate in Acting. He has worked in television dramas such as Star Runner and Sir Arthur Conan Doyle's The Lost World in which he played Professor George Challenger. His character on The Lost World was a scientist with a thirst to prove the existence of dinosaurs on a plateau in the jungle. When the expedition is stranded he and other characters come upon various societies and creatures. The show lasted for 3 seasons before cancellation due to financial issues. He also appeared in several episodes of the Starz hit series Spartacus.

He has since worked for the BBC editing movies and television series.

Filmography

Film

Television

Theatre

References

External links
 
 Bio

Living people
New Zealand male television actors
New Zealand male soap opera actors
20th-century New Zealand male actors
21st-century New Zealand male actors
1950 births
Toi Whakaari alumni